Farkha is a Palestinian village located in the Salfit Governorate in the northern West Bank, 30 kilometers south of Nablus. According to the Palestinian Central Bureau of Statistics, it had a population of approximately 1,336 in 2007.

Location
It is bordered by Salfit to the east and north, Qarawat Bani Zaid and Bani Zaid ash Sharqiya to the south, and Bruqin village to the west.

History
Pottery sherds from the Middle Bronze Age, Iron Age I and IA II, Persian, Hellenistic, Roman, Byzantine and Crusader/Ayyubid have been found here.

It was populated by Samaritans up until the Arab conquest, and probably later into the Umayyad period.

An Ayyubid text in the village mosque, first noted in situ by D.C. Bamraki, dates it to 1210 CE.

Pottery sherds from the Mamluk era have also been found here.
The village is seem to be the birthplace of the Muslim scholar Abdullah al-Farkhawi (d. 1415).

Ottoman era
In 1517, the village was included in the Ottoman empire with the rest of Palestine, and in the 1596 tax-records it appeared  as Farha, located in the Nahiya of Jabal Quba, part of Nablus Sanjak. The population was 17 households, all Muslim. They paid a  fixed tax rate of 33,3% on agricultural products, such as wheat, barley, summer crops, olive trees, goats and beehives, in addition to occasional revenues and a fixed tax for people of Nablus area; a total of 2,800 akçe. Pottery sherds from the early Ottoman era has also been found here.

In 1838, Furkha was noted as village in the Jurat Merda area, south of Nablus.

In 1870, Victor Guérin on his travels noted Farkha as a "considerable" village, located on a mountain peak.

In 1882, the PEF's Survey of Western Palestine  described Furkhah as: "An ancient village in a very strong position on a steep hill-top. The houses are of stone, and there are three sacred tombs, including Haram en Neby Shit, on the south. The fountain of Ain Yambua, in the valley, gives a supply of fine water, and there are two other springs east of the village. The place is evidently an ancient site. The hills around it are very steep and rocky."

British Mandate era
In the 1922 census of Palestine conducted by the British Mandate authorities, Farkha had a population of 210 Muslims, increasing in the 1931 census to 304 Muslims in 54 occupied houses.

Tawfiq Canaan mention the custom of Mafazeh at the top of the ascent of Farkah; “a traveller after climbing a high mountain raises a heap of stones, or throw a stone on an existing heap,  saying at the same time prayer as a mark of thanks to God that he has overcome a difficulty."

In the 1945 statistics the population was 380 Muslims while the total land area was 5,675 dunams, according to an official land and population survey. Of this, 1,753 were allocated for plantations and irrigable land, 1,301 for cereals, while 14 dunams were classified as built-up areas.

Jordanian era
In the wake of the 1948 Arab–Israeli War, and after the 1949 Armistice Agreements, Farkha came under Jordanian rule.

The Jordanian census of 1961 found 564 inhabitants.

Post-1967
Since the Six-Day War in 1967, Farkha has been under Israeli occupation.

After the 1995 accords, Israel and Israeli settlements got 80% of the water from the Western Aquifer, leading  often to severe shortages of water in Farkha.

After 1995, 48% of village land is defined as Area A land, 21.6% is Area B, while the remaining 30.4% is defined as Area C land. As of 2013, the plans for the Segregation Wall would isolate the village from much of its land behind the wall.

References

Bibliography

External links
Welcome to Farkha
Survey of Western Palestine, Map 14:  IAA, Wikimedia commons 
Farkha village (fact sheet), Applied Research Institute–Jerusalem (ARIJ)
Farkha village profile, ARIJ
Farkha aerial photo, ARIJ
Development Priorities and Needs in Farkha, ARIJ

Towns in Salfit Governorate
Municipalities of the State of Palestine
Ancient Samaritan settlements